The PBA on Solar Sports (formerly known as PBA on C/S 9 and PBA on Solar TV) was branding used for presentation of Philippine Basketball Association basketball games produced by Solar Sports which began in the 2008-09 season. Solar Entertainment had acquired the rights to the PBA after a highly publicized bidding war with major broadcaster ABS-CBN, and aired games on several channels, including Basketball TV, the Radio Philippines Network (which Solar was operating), and later the ABS-CBN-owned Studio 23.

PBA telecasts moved to AKTV after Solar's contract ended in 2011.

History

Bidding process
The Associated Broadcasting Company (ABC) had broadcast PBA games since 2004 on its VHF Channel 5, succeeding the failed NBN and IBC consortium which left the league in debt. ABC's current contract would expire at the end of the 2007-08 season, so the league began to accept bids for the next contract. ABC, the ABS-CBN Broadcasting Corporation (through ABS-CBN Sports), and the Solar Entertainment Corporation emerged as frontrunners.

ABS-CBN has served as the official broadcaster of UAAP basketball games since 2000. As part of its bid for the contract, ABS-CBN organized a charity exhibition game which aired on Studio 23, featuring PBA alumni from the Ateneo Blue Eagles and the De La Salle Green Archers. Solar Entertainment had recently begun a partnership with RPN to provide programming for the network, primarily in response to a carriage dispute with ABS-CBN-owned cable provider SkyCable; which saw 6 of its networks (including its sports channels Solar Sports and Basketball TV) pulled from its systems in January 2008. However, ABC was reported to be piqued at the way the league was handling the bidding practice, hence it backed out of the bidding process. ABC had paid ₱70 million to air the 2007-08 season, its last.

The backing out of ABC narrowed down the field to two possible broadcasters; ABS-CBN (who would broadcast games on its main network and Studio 23), and Solar Entertainment (who would air games on Basketball TV and RPN, which Solar then operated under the on-air brand C/S 9). GMA Network was also reportedly planning to bid but backed out; it however denied that they offered a bid.

Another bidder eventually came into force, the Makisig Network; which would air the games on Intercontinental Broadcasting Corporation's DZTV-TV. However, it was reported that both ABS-CBN and Solar submitted identical bids to the PBA Board: ₱160 million for the first year, ₱168 million for the second and ₱170 million for the third year (compared to ABC's ₱70 million for its fifth year).

PBA Chairman Tony Chua of Red Bull Barako pushed the board to come out with a decision as soon as possible; former PBA chairman Ricky Vargas of the Talk 'N Text Phone Pals, a supporter of the ABS-CBN bid, said that money should not be a deciding factor. Also, Chua announced that Nielsen Media Research would research the comparative reach, demographics and audience share of both bids and present their findings to the PBA board. After receiving Nielsen's data, another provider, Mind Shares, was consulted. By this time, the bids were now slightly different: Solar's bid was ₱31 million greater than the amount ABS-CBN offered for the first three years of the contract, while ABS-CBN offered a four-year package with the option to sign a three-year contract-extension at the end of the initial deal, with Solar a straight-up three-year deal.

ABS-CBN backed out its bid after receiving a solitary vote in the 9-member board. However, Solar Sports didn't automatically clinch the bid outright since the league was "insisting on a lockout to protect business interests of its team members". It was revealed that, according to Mind Share, if the PBA aired on RPN, it would rate 7.9%, while if it aired on Studio 23, it would rate 1.8%, "without taking into consideration the tremendous cross-promotions boost that would immediately impact on ratings under an ABS-CBN partnership." This caused Solar Sports to be the de facto front-runner.

Solar and the PBA
On May 27, 2008, the PBA announced that Solar Sports had won the rights with a deal reportedly worth ₱508 million. Aside from live games aired on RPN, Solar would provide additional coverage on its Basketball TV cable channel. The return of the PBA to RPN dates back to the inaugural season of the PBA in 1975 when games were broadcast on KBS.

During an October 15, 2010, double-header during the Philippine Cups' elimination round, Solar's satellite equipment experienced multiple faults, including alleged problems with the encoder and power amplifier. These technical problems caused intermittent interruptions to the telecasts, and forced a game between the Meralco Bolts and the Talk 'N Text Tropang Texters to be aired on Basketball TV the next day on tape delay. The technical problems resulted in commissioner Chito Salud issuing a ₱3,000,000 fine to Solar for not broadcasting a game live, a condition of the network's contract with the league. In a meeting with the PBA's board, Solar also promised that it would take steps to improve the quality of its telecasts and prevent such issues from occurring in the future.

Move to Studio 23
In December 2010, Solar Entertainment announced that they would be seeking a new broadcast television partner for its PBA coverage due to a planned relaunch of the Solar TV network, with a new lineup aimed more towards women (resulting in the dropping of all other sports programming from its lineup). Solar executives held meetings with representatives from ABS-CBN, the GMA Network, and the Associated Broadcasting Company in order to gauge interest in picking up the package, while commissioner Chito Salud made a statement on December 2 that the PBA board's only concern would be Solar's commitment to the rest of their contract with the league. On December 12, Salud announced that the PBA's Board of Governors officially approved Solar's request to find a new broadcasting partner.

On February 8, 2011, the board approved a proposal made by Solar Sports to produce PBA telecasts to air on ABS-CBN's Studio 23 network for the remainder of their contract with the league, beginning with the 2011 Commissioner's Cup. Peter Musñgi, vice president of ABS-CBN's sports department, applauded the decision, considering it a "vote of confidence" for Studio 23 and ABS-CBN's sports division as a whole.

Solar declined to renew its contract beyond the 2011-12 season. Sports5 and AKTV became the new official broadcasters of the PBA following the 2011 Governors' Cup.

Solar aired on Studio 23 it is the last PBA games during the Game 7 of the 2011 Governors' cup between the Petron Blaze Boosters and the Talk 'N Text Tropang Texters. Sev Sarmenta, Andy Jao and Quinito Henson were the commentators for its last run.

Commentators
Solar Entertainment announced their announcing team for the 2008-09 season at a meeting in Makati. Longtime PBA panelists Ed Picson and Quinito Henson covered their first game for the 2008-09 season between Talk 'N Text and Coca-Cola. Sev Sarmenta joined the PBA panel in February 2009 after a 6-year hiatus.

Final Presenters

Anchors
Mico Halili
Paolo Trillo
Magoo Marjon
Sev Sarmenta
Patricia Bermudez-Hizon
Richard del Rosario

Color
Norman Black
Danny Francisco
Quinito Henson
Vince Hizon
Jason Webb
Andy Jao
Ronnie Magsanoc
Alex Compton
Yeng Guiao

Courtside reporters
Patricia Bermudez-Hizon
Dominic Uy
Chiqui Reyes
Jinno Rufino
Magoo Marjon
Mica Abesamis
Cesca Litton
Marga Vargas

Former

Anchors
Ed Picson
Jude Turcuato
Jimmy Javier
Benjie Santiago
Vitto Lazatin

Courtside reporters
Lia Cruz
Peaches Aberin
Reema Chanco

References

See also
PBA on KBS - The PBA's original coverage partner.
List of programs previously broadcast by Radio Philippines Network

Solar TV
Solar Entertainment Corporation
Radio Philippines Network original programming
2008 Philippine television series debuts
2011 Philippine television series endings
Philippine sports television series